The Bills–Jets rivalry is a rivalry between the Buffalo Bills and New York Jets in the National Football League. Both of these teams play in the same division (AFC East) and as a result, play two scheduled games each season. Both teams represent New York State, with the Bills having their primary fan base in Western New York, and the Jets in the New York City area.

This rivalry is fueled primarily by the differences between the greater New York City metropolitan area and the rest of New York State, but also by the Bills being the only team physically located in New York due to the Jets and their NFC counterparts the Giants playing their games in the New Jersey suburbs of New York City. However, the two teams have rarely been successful at the same time, and as such, their rivalry usually lacks the intensity that is present in other rivalries, such as the Bills' rivalry with the Dolphins and the Jets' with the Patriots. There have only been four seasons in which both the Bills and Jets finished with winning records. Regardless, the two teams share a bond due to this seeming inability to field winning teams simultaneously, having been the two NFL teams coached by Rex Ryan, and their long histories playing twice yearly against one another going back to the first days of the AFL.

The Bills lead the overall series, 68–57.  The Bills also won the only postseason meeting, defeating the Jets 31–27 in the 1981 AFC Wild Card round.

Notable moments

1960–99: Early History
There were a handful of memorable games in the early history of this rivalry. During the Jets' Super Bowl winning year in 1968, the Bills defense intercepted Joe Namath five times, including three pick-sixes, as Buffalo upset the Jets 37–35 for its only win that year. In 1973, O. J. Simpson eclipsed Jim Brown's rushing yards record to surpass 2,000 yards in a 34–6 Bills win. Eight years later, the teams played their only playoff game together. In the 1981 AFC wild card game, the Bills had a 24–0 lead early in the game, but the Jets came back, cutting their deficit to 31–24. A late game interception of Richard Todd sealed the win for the Bills, however.

In the quarterback-rich 1983 NFL draft, the Bills selected quarterback Jim Kelly whereas the Jets famously passed on Dan Marino in favor of Ken O'Brien. This led to a period of dominance by the Kelly-led Bills over the Jets in the late 1980s and early 1990s.

The Jets and Bills played two regular season games with playoff implications in the 1990s. The 1993 season saw the Jets failing to secure a playoff berth by losing a game to the Bills via three missed field goals. In 1998, the Jets secured their first ever AFC East division title by beating the Bills.

2000–17
As the 2000s approached, Buffalo collapsed from a perennial Super Bowl contender to one of the worst teams in the league, while the Jets maintained a level of success, making the playoffs 5 times despite a period of dominance by the Tom Brady-led New England Patriots. However, the Bills finally ended their league-leading playoff drought in 2017, while the Jets have yet to return to the playoffs since last qualifying in 2010.

In 2008, the Bills were coming off a 5–1 start, but lost 8 of their remaining ten games to finish 7–9 and out of the playoffs. Two of those losses came against the Jets; the latter included a J. P. Losman fumble returned for the Jets' game-winning touchdown as the Bills were trying to run out the clock.

2009–2016: the Rex Ryan era

In 2009, the first year of Rex Ryan's six-year tenure as the Jets' head coach, Mark Sanchez threw 5 interceptions to the Bills defense, losing a game in overtime for the Jets in which they rushed for 318 yards. Later that year, the Jets rematched the Bills in Toronto as part of the Bills Toronto Series, in which the Jets avenged their loss with a 19–13 win that kept their playoff hopes alive.

During the 2013 NFL draft, the Bills and Jets once again selected quarterbacks with their early picks. EJ Manuel was picked by Buffalo in the first round while Geno Smith was chosen in the second round by the Jets. Ultimately, neither quarterback panned out and both were gone from their teams after 2016.

In 2014, the second Bills–Jets game was played at Ford Field in Detroit due to a freak snowstorm in Buffalo. The Bills won 38–3.

The 2015 offseason saw some notable personnel swaps between the teams. On January 12, Rex Ryan was hired as the head coach of the Bills shortly after his dismissal by the Jets, serving as Buffalo's head coach for the next two years. In addition, the Jets hired former Bills head coach Chan Gailey as their offensive coordinator and traded for former Bills starting quarterback Ryan Fitzpatrick who later became their own starter. The Bills also added former Jets Percy Harvin and IK Enemkpali, the latter one day after he was released for breaking Geno Smith's jaw in a locker room altercation. The Bills won both games in 2015, knocking the Jets out of playoff contention with their second win. Tensions arose during the first game on Thursday Night Football when both teams were still in the hunt for a playoff spot, especially after Ryan made Enemkpali a team captain for that game. Despite Ryan's short tenure as the Bills' coach and firing before the second Bills-Jets matchup of 2016, his presence on the Bills briefly re-energized the rivalry.

2018–present: the Josh Allen era

2018–20: Allen vs. Darnold
In the 2018 NFL Draft, the Bills and Jets each traded up in order to select a highly touted quarterback. This resulted in Sam Darnold landing with the Jets 3rd overall and Josh Allen being selected by the Bills 7th overall.  Allen and Darnold met on the field for the first time as rivals on December 9, 2018, with both having missed the first Bills–Jets match-up that year due to injury. The Bills jumped to an early 14–3 lead under Allen, but the Jets fought back with good special teams play to set up short fields and tied the game at 20 by the fourth quarter. After the Bills scored a field goal to retake the lead with just over two minutes to go, Darnold led a game-winning drive for the Jets, including a 37-yard pass to Robby Anderson to set up the go-ahead touchdown run by Elijah McGuire.

On September 8, 2019, the Bills overcame a 16–0 third quarter deficit and four turnovers to beat the Jets 17–16 at MetLife Stadium on opening day of the season. The Jets unraveled after losing linebacker C. J. Mosley to injury and were also hampered by ineffective placekicking from Kaare Vedvik. The momentum would carry over as Buffalo wound up making the playoffs while New York was unable to overcome a 1–7 start, despite both teams being expected to be competitive that year. Having clinched a playoff spot by then, the Bills rested several starters during the week 17 rematch, which the Jets won 13–6.

The second Bills–Jets matchup of the 2020 season was noteworthy as the then-winless Jets held a potent Bills offense out of the endzone, but Buffalo still prevailed 18–10 thanks to six field goals by rookie kicker Tyler Bass. Not only did the Bills sweep the yearly series, but the franchises had nearly exact opposite years with the Bills finishing 13–3 but the Jets just 2–14 to begin the new decade, continuing a long general trend of the two teams being unable to be simultaneously successful. Allen had his best season thus far with a 107.2 passer rating and 37 touchdowns, while Darnold had his worst with a 72.7 rating and just 9 touchdowns in 12 games. The Jets traded Darnold to the Carolina Panthers following the season, drafting Zach Wilson to replace him.

2021–present
After Allen and the Bills swept the Jets in 2021, the Wilson-led Jets won the first matchup in 2022, as a 6-minute-long drive that started at New York's 4-yard line set up the game winning field goal. With under 2 minutes left, the Bills were unable to respond, as a holding penalty against tackle Dion Dawkins and a strip sack of Allen that left him injured caused the Bills to turn the ball over on downs, allowing a 20–17 Jets upset win over the heavily-favored Bills. This game was the first time since  that both teams met with winning records. By the time of the rematch, Wilson had been benched for Mike White, who had started one game against Buffalo the previous year, and the Jets were in the middle of what would become a six-game losing streak to end the year out of playoff contention while the Bills were in the middle of a seven-game winning streak to end the year. Just as in his previous start against Buffalo, White struggled and was injured during the 20–12 Bills win. During this game, he was knocked out of the game twice, suffering what was later revealed to be broken ribs, but decided to return to the game both times, earning the respect of fans and players from both teams.

Gallery

Season-by-season results 

|-
| 1960
| style="| 
| style="| Titans  17–13
| style="| Titans  27–3
| Titans  2–0
| Bills and then-Titans are two charter members of the AFL.  First meetings between the two rivals.
|-
| 1961
| Tie, 1–1
| style="| Bills  41–31
| style="| Titans 21–14
| Titans  3–1
|
|-
| 1962
| Tie, 1–1
| style="| Titans  17–6
| style="| Bills  20–3
| Titans  4–2
|
|-
| 1963
| style="| 
| style="| Bills  45–14
| style="| Bills  19–10
| Tie  4–4
| Titans change their name to "Jets."
|-
| 1964
| style="| 
| style="| Bills  34–24
| style="| Bills  20–7
| Bills  6–4
| Jets move to Shea Stadium; Bills win 1964 AFL Championship.
|-
| 1965
| Tie, 1–1
| style="| Bills  33–21
| style="| Jets  14–12
| Bills  7–5
| Bills win 1965 AFL Championship.
|-
| 1966
| style="| 
| style="| Bills  14–3
| style="| Bills  33–23
| Bills  9–5
|
|-
| 1967
| Tie, 1–1
| style="| Bills  20–17
| style="| Jets  20–10
| Bills  10–6
| 
|-
| 1968
| Tie, 1–1
| style="| Bills  37–35
| style="| Jets  25–21
| Bills  11–7
| Jets win 1968 AFL championship, win Super Bowl III. Bills' only win of the year comes against Jets.
|-
| 1969
| style="| 
| style="| Jets  33–19
| style="| Jets  16–6
| Bills  11–9
| 
|-

|-
| 
| style="| 
| style="| Bills  34–31
| style="| Bills  10–6
| Bills  13–9
| AFL–NFL merger.  Both teams placed in AFC East.  
|-
| 
| style="| 
| style="| Jets  20–7
| style="| Jets  28–17
| Bills  13–11
| 
|-
| 
| style="| 
| style="| Jets  41–24
| style="| Jets  41–3
| Tie  13–13
|
|-
| 
| style="| 
| style="| Bills  9–7
| style="| Bills  34–14
| Bills  15–13
| Bills open Rich Stadium (now known as New Era Field). O. J. Simpson breaks NFL regular season rushing record against Jets in New York. Bills came into that game needing a win and Bengals loss to clinch playoff spot (the Bills won at the Jets; but the Bengals defeated the Oilers later that afternoon, costing Buffalo a playoff appearance)
|-
| 
| Tie 1–1
| style="| Bills  16–12
| style="| Jets  20–10
| Bills  16–14
| 
|-
| 
| style="| 
| style="| Bills  42–14
| style="| Bills  42–14
| Bills  18–14
| Bills rush for 309 yards at Rich Stadium, most rushing yards given up by Jets at the time.
|-
| 
| Tie, 1–1
| style="| Jets  17–14
| style="| Bills  24–23
| Bills  19–15
| 
|-
| 
| style="| 
| style="| Jets  19–14
| style="| Jets  24–19
| Bills  19–17
| 
|-
| 
| Tie 1–1
| style="| Bills  14–10
| style="| Jets 21–20
| Bills  20–18
| 
|-
| 
| Tie 1–1
| style="| Jets  45–14
| style="| Bills  46–31
| Bills  21–19
| 
|-

|-
| 
| style="| 
| style="| Bills  14–12
| style="| Bills  20–10
| Bills  23–19
| 
|-
| 
| Tie 1–1
| style="| Bills  31–0
| style="| Jets  33–14
| Bills  24–20
|
|- style="background:#f2f2f2; font-weight:bold;"
|  1981 Playoffs
| style=""| 
|
| style=""| Bills  31–27
| Bills  25–20
| AFC Wild Card playoffs.  Only playoff meeting to date.
|-
| 
|colspan="3"| No games
| Bills  25–20
| Both meetings cancelled due to 1982 NFL player strike.
|-
| 
| Tie 1–1
| style="| Jets  34–10
| style="| Bills  24–17
| Bills  26–21
| Jim Kelly and Ken O'Brien drafted as part of QB class of 1983.
|-
| 
| style="| 
| style="| Jets  28–26
| style="| Jets  21–17
| Bills  26–23
| Jets move to Giants Stadium
|-
| 
| style="| 
| style="| Jets  27–7
| style="| Jets  42–3
| Bills  26–25
| 
|-
| 
| style="| 
| style="| Jets  28–24
| style="| Jets  14–13
| Jets  27–26
| The first game marked the debut of Jim Kelly as Bills quarterback (though drafted in 1983; Kelly had chosen to play for the United States Football League's Houston Gamblers). The second game was remembered for referee Ben Dreith's "giving him the business" call after Jets defensive end Marty Lyons repeatedly punched Kelly in the head.
|-
| 
| Tie 1–1
| style="| Jets  31–28
| style="| Bills  17–14
| Jets  28–27
| Jets win seventh straight meeting and fifth straight in Buffalo.
|-
| 
| style="| 
| style="| Bills  9–6 (OT)
| style="| Bills  37–14
| Bills  29–28
| The Week 7 game vs. the Bills was the last for Jets defensive end Mark Gastineau prior to abruptly retiring to tend to girlfriend Brigette Nielsen after Nielsen was diagnosed with uterine cancer.
|-
| 
| style="| 
| style="| Bills  34–3
| style="| Bills  37–0
| Bills  31–28
| Bills clinch AFC East in final week of the regular season in the Meadowlands.

|-
| 
| style="| 
| style="| Bills  30–27
| style="| Bills  30–7
| Bills  33–28
| Bills lose Super Bowl XXV.
|-
| 
| style="| 
| style="| Bills  24–13
| style="| Bills  23–20
| Bills  35–28
| Bills lose Super Bowl XXVI.
|-
| 
| Tie 1–1
| style="| Jets  24–17
| style="| Bills  24–20
| Bills  36–29
| Bills win tenth straight meeting immediately following Jets' seven game winning streak. The Jets snapped Buffalo's 10-game winning streak one week after defensive end Dennis Byrd suffered a neck injury that initially left him paralyzed. Bills lose Super Bowl XXVII.
|-
| 
| style="| 
| style="| Bills  16–14
| style="| Bills  19–10
| Bills  38–29
| Bills win sixth straight away meeting.  Bills lose Super Bowl XXVIII.
|-
| 
| style="| 
| style="| Jets  23–13
| style="| Jets  22–17
| Bills  38–31
| Jets sweep the Bills for the first time since 1986.
|-
| 
| style="| 
| style="| Bills  29–10
| style="| Bills  28–26
| Bills  40–31
| 
|-
| 
| style="| 
| style="| Bills  35–10
| style="| Bills  25–22
| Bills  42–31
|  
|-
| 
| style="| 
| style="| Bills  20–10
| style="| Bills  28–22
| Bills  44–31
| Bills have won 18 of 21 meetings dating back to 1987.
|-
| 
| style="| 
| style="| Jets  17–10
| style="| Jets  34–12
| Bills  44–33
| Jets beat Bills to clinch their first AFC East title.
|-
| 
| Tie 1–1
| style="| Bills  17–3
| style="| Jets  17–7
| Bills  45–34
| 
|-

|-
| 
| Tie 1–1
| style="| Bills  23–20
| style="| Jets  27–14
| Bills  46–35
| 
|-
| 
| Tie 1–1
| style="| Jets  42–36
| style="| Bills  14–9
| Bills  47–36
| 
|-
| 
| style="| 
| style="| Jets  37–31(OT)
| style="| Jets  31–13
| Bills  47–38
| 
|-
| 
| Tie 1–1
| style="| Bills  17–6
| style="| Jets  30–3
| Bills  48–39
| 
|-
| 
| Tie 1–1
| style="| Bills  22–17
| style="| Jets  16–14
| Bills  49–40
| 
|-
| 
| Tie 1–1
| style="| Bills  27–17
| style="| Jets  30–26
| Bills  50–41
| Jets respond to Bills' go-ahead field goal with Justin Miller's game-winning kick return touchdown at the Meadowlands.
|-
| 
| Tie 1–1
| style="| Jets  28–20
| style="| Bills  31–13
| Bills  51–42
| 
|-
| 
| style="| 
| style="| Bills  17–14
| style="| Bills  13–3
| Bills  53–42
| Bills WR Lee Evans boxes out Jets CB Darrelle Revis for Bills' game-clinching touchdown.
|-
| 
| style="| 
| style="| Jets  26–17
| style="| Jets  31–27
| Bills  53–44
| In Jets home game, Bills QB J. P. Losman fumbles while trying to run out the clock, resulting in Jets' game-winning touchdown. 
|-
| 
| Tie 1–1
| style="| Jets  19–13
| style="| Bills  16–13(OT)
| Bills  54–45
| Jets QB Mark Sanchez throws five interceptions in Jets home game, team has six overallBills home game played at the Rogers Centre in Toronto as part of the Bills Toronto Series.
|-

|-
| 
| style="| 
| style="| Jets  38–14
| style="| Jets  38–7
| Bills  54–47
| Jets and Giants open MetLife Stadium (then known as New Meadowlands Stadium).
|-
| 
| style="| 
| style="| Jets  27–11
| style="| Jets  28–24
| Bills  54–49
| 
|-
| 
| Tie 1–1
| style="| Bills  28–9
| style="| Jets  48–28
| Bills  55–50
| Jets win sixth straight meeting before losing season finale to Bills.
|-
| 
| Tie 1–1
| style="| Bills  37–14
| style="| Jets  27–20
| Bills  56–51
| 
|-
| 
| style="| 
| style="| Bills  38–3
| style="| Bills  43–23
| Bills  58–51
| Bills home game moved to Ford Field in Detroit due to inclement weather. Bills' first sweep of the Jets since 1997.
|-
| 
| style="| 
| style="| Bills  22–17
| style="| Bills  22–17
| Bills  60–51
| Bills hire Rex Ryan, eliminate Jets from playoff contention in week 17.
|-
| 
| style="| 
| style="| Jets  37–31
| style="| Jets  30–10
| Bills  60–53
| 
|-
| 
| Tie 1–1
| style="| Bills  21–12
| style="| Jets  34–21
| Bills  61–54
| 
|-
| 
| Tie 1–1
| style="| Jets  27–23
| style="| Bills  41–10
| Bills  62–55
| First meeting between Sam Darnold and Josh Allen
|-
| 
| Tie 1–1
| style="| Jets  13–6
| style="| Bills  17–16
| Bills  63–56
| Bills overcome 16–0 deficit and four turnovers to win 17–16 at MetLife Stadium.
|-

|-
|-
| 
| style="| 
| style="| Bills  27–17
| style="| Bills  18–10
| Bills  65–56
| Bills overcome 10–0 deficit on the road despite never scoring a touchdown to win. Bills sweep division for the first time in franchise history.
|-
| 
| style="| 
| style="| Bills  27–10
| style="| Bills  45–17
| Bills  67–56
| Bills clinch AFC East against the Jets in their week 18 meeting in Buffalo.
|-
| 
| Tie 1–1
| style="| Bills  20–12
| style="| Jets  20–17
| Bills  68–57
|
|- 

|-
| AFL regular season
| style="|Bills 11–9
| Bills 7–3
| Jets 6–4
|
|-
| NFL regular season
| style="|Bills 56–48
| Bills 29–23 
| Bills 27–25
| Jets won a game in Toronto, Bills won a game in Detroit (both were Bills home games)
|-
| AFL and NFL regular season
| style="|Bills 67–57
| Bills 36–26
| Tie 31–31 
| 
|-
| NFL postseason
| style="|Bills 1–0
| no games
| Bills 1–0
| 1981 AFC Wild Card playoffs
|-
| Regular and postseason 
| style="|Bills 68–57
| Bills 36–26 
| Bills 32–31 
| 
|-

Connections between the teams

Coaches
The most notable connection between the Bills and Jets has been Rex Ryan, who carried over many of his staff from the Jets when he was hired as the Bills' head coach.

Players
Several players have been members of both teams during their careers, including:

References

National Football League rivalries
Buffalo Bills
New York Jets
American football in New York (state)
Buffalo Bills rivalries
New York Jets rivalries